The 1962 All-Ireland Senior Camogie Championship Final was the 31st All-Ireland Final and the deciding match of the 1962 All-Ireland Senior Camogie Championship, an inter-county camogie tournament for the top teams in Ireland.

Dublin won a sixth title in a row.

References

All-Ireland Senior Camogie Championship Final
All-Ireland Senior Camogie Championship Final
All-Ireland Senior Camogie Championship Final, 1962
All-Ireland Senior Camogie Championship Finals
Dublin county camogie team matches